Martin Albert Frédéric Terrier (born 4 March 1997) is a French professional footballer who plays as winger or forward for Ligue 1 club Rennes.

He has played over 170 games and scored over 50 goals in Ligue 1 for Lille, Strasbourg, Lyon and Rennes. He joined the last two clubs for €11 million and €12 million, respectively.

Club career

Lille

Born in Armentières in 1997, Terrier started his football career with SC Bailleul youth team. He moved to Lille in 2004.

In 2016, Terrier was called up for the Lille first team. On 22 October, he made his Ligue 1 debut against Bastia at Stade Pierre-Mauroy, replacing Yves Bissouma in the 84th minute. On 14 December, he played the full match in the round of 16 of the Coupe de la Ligue in a 3–1 away defeat against PSG. On 7 January 2017, he scored his first professional goal in the 90th minute of a 4–1 home win in the round of 64 of Coupe de France,  against Excelsior. On 29 April, he scored his first goal in Ligue 1, as a substitute, in the 75th minute of a 3–0 away win over Montpellier.

On 18 August 2017, Terrier was signed by fellow Ligue 1 side Strasbourg on a season-long loan deal. On 27 August, he made his debut in a 2–0 away defeat against Guingamp, playing the full match. On 30 September, he scored his first goal as a substitute in the second minute of added time, in a 1–1 away draw against Dijon.

Lyon
On 26 January 2018, Terrier was sold by Lille to Lyon for €11 million, with a potential €4 million addition, with Lille keeping 10% of a future fee. He signed until the summer of 2022. Lyon loaned him straight back to Strasbourg so that he would finish his deal there. He scored on his debut for Lyon, opening a 2–0 home win over Strasbourg on 24 August.

He scored his first European goal on 2 October 2019 in a 2–0 win at RB Leipzig in the UEFA Champions League group stage, starting ahead of Moussa Dembélé and Jeff Reine-Adélaïde.

Rennes
On 6 July 2020, Rennes announced that Terrier had signed a five-year contract with the club, for a reported €12 million plus bonus fees. He made his debut on 22 August, playing the full 90 minutes of the season opener away to his former club Lille; a week later he was sent off in a 2–1 home win over Montpellier. He opened his account on 16 October with the first goal of a 1–1 draw at Dijon, eventually finishing the season with nine goals, including two at home to the same opponents in a 5–1 win on 25 April 2021.

In 2021–22, Terrier scored his first goal in the third match on 22 August, the only one of a Derby Breton win over Nantes at Roazhon Park. On 5 December, he scored his first hat-trick in a 5–0 win at Saint-Étienne. The season was the most prolific of his career with 21 goals, joint third in the league behind Kylian Mbappé and Wissam Ben Yedder and equal to Moussa Dembélé. He was the UNFP Player of the Month for March and made the Team of the Year.

International career
Uncapped, Terrier was chosen by France under-20 for the 2017 FIFA World Cup in South Korea. On his debut on 22 May in the first group game, he came on as a 66th-minute substitute for Jean-Kévin Augustin, and 15 minutes later scored the final goal of a 3–0 win over Honduras. He played each other game of a run to the last 16, including the entirety of the final group game in which the French won 2–0 against New Zealand.

Terrier made his under-21 debut on 5 September 2017, in a 4–1 win over Kazakhstan in Le Mans, in 2019 UEFA European Championship qualification. On in the 57th minute for Adama Diakhaby, he scored a hat-trick. In his next three games, he scored once against Montenegro from the bench, twice as a starter against Luxembourg and again at home to Bulgaria, thereby scoring all seven of his under-21 goals in the first four of his 13 games.

Career statistics

Club

Honours
Lyon

 Coupe de la Ligue runner-up: 2019–20

Individual
 UNFP Ligue 1 Team of the Year: 2021–22
UNFP Ligue 1 Player of the Month: March 2022, October 2022

References

External links

 
 

Living people
1997 births
People from Armentières
Sportspeople from Nord (French department)
Association football forwards
French footballers
Ligue 1 players
Lille OSC players
Olympique Lyonnais players
RC Strasbourg Alsace players
Stade Rennais F.C. players
France under-21 international footballers
France youth international footballers
Footballers from Hauts-de-France